Macklyn Stengler (July 31, 1895 – May 27, 1962) was an American cinematographer whose Hollywood cinema and television career spanned 40 years.

Partial filmography

 That Model from Paris (1926)
 College Days (1926)
 The Millionaire Policeman (1926)
 Sin Cargo (1926)
 Out of the Storm (1926)
 One Hour of Love (1927)
 The First Night (1927)
 Silver Comes Through (1927)
 Hired Wife (1934)
 Chloe, Love Is Calling You (1934)
 We're in the Legion Now! (1936)
 The Devil on Horseback (1936)
 King of the Zombies (1941)
 Gambling Daughters (1941)
 Let's Go Collegiate (1941)
 Reg'lar Fellers (1941)
 Duke of the Navy (1942)
 Campus Rhythm (1943)
 Ghosts on the Loose (1943)
The Crime Smasher (1943)
 Adventures of Kitty O'Day (1945)
 Fall Guy (1947)
 Jens Mansson in America (1947)

References

External links
 .

American cinematographers
1895 births
1962 deaths
People from Wisconsin